Becca Blackwell (born 1973/1974) is an American trans actor, performer, and playwright based in New York City. Blackwell's pronoun is the singular they. Their play "They, Themself and Schmerm," has been presented by a number of venues including The Public Theater's 2018 Under the Radar Festival, Abrons Arts Center and the Portland Institute for Contemporary Art's TBA Festival. Musician Kathleen Hanna, writing for Artforum, listed Blackwell among their favourite performers of 2014. Blackwell was a recipient of a 2015 Doris Duke Impact Award. In 2016 they were interviewed by Jim Fletcher for BOMB Magazine. Blackwell is part of the 2019 class of the Joe's Pub Working Group, a program dedicated to supporting artists at a critical point in their careers.

References 

Year of birth missing (living people)
Living people
American non-binary actors
Nationality missing
Transgender non-binary people
21st-century American LGBT people
American transgender writers
American non-binary writers